Fly Micronesia LLC doing business as Fly Guam is a company incorporated in the United States territory of Guam which operated public charter flights operated by Sky King, Inc. Its headquarters are in Tiyan, Barrigada.  The company slogan is We're Different.

History
In November 2009 CEO Jeffrey Stern along with executive directors visited Guam looking for business opportunities in Micronesia. Upon finding a niche market between Guam and Asia they began the process of creating the new company. A year later, November 2010, Fly Micronesia LLC d.b.a. Fly Guam was registered on Guam.

Fly Guam advertised as a "different" air carrier as they claimed to bring the spirit of Guam and the native Chamorro culture on board the aircraft. Local cuisine and an ocean theme interior design mimicked the island of Guam.

On March 4, 2011, the inaugural flight flew from Guam via Saipan to Hong Kong

Service to Palau began on August 4, 2011. Fly Guam began service to Taipei on August 20, 2011.

The airline has not operated a flight since January 2012.

Destinations
Fly Guam served the following destinations at the time of its last flight:

Antonio B. Won Pat International Airport

Hong Kong International Airport [Seasonal]

Nagoya - Chūbu Centrair International Airport

Koror City - Roman Tmetuchl International Airport

Saipan - Saipan International Airport

Taipei - Taiwan Taoyuan International Airport

Fleet
Fly Guam chartered a single Boeing 737-400 (N238AG) configured with 12 business class and 132 economy seats leased on an ACMI contract with Sky King.

See also 
 List of defunct airlines of the United States

References

Airlines of Guam
Companies of Guam
Airlines established in 2011
2011 establishments in Guam
2011 establishments in Oceania
Economic history of Guam